Thomas Aloysius Cantwell  (December 23, 1888 - April 1, 1968) was a Major League Baseball pitcher for the 1909-10 Cincinnati Reds.

External links

Major League Baseball pitchers
Cincinnati Reds players
Baseball players from Washington, D.C.
1888 births
1968 deaths
Milwaukee Brewers (minor league) players
Newark Indians players
Evansville Strikers players
South Bend Bux players
South Bend Benders players
Grand Rapids Grads players
Terre Haute Terre-iers players